The Battle of Campomorto was a battle fought near Frosinone, in the Lazio (Italy) on August 21, 1482, in the course of the War of Ferrara.

It saw the Papal army, led by the condottiero Roberto Malatesta, face King Ferdinand I of Naples's army, under the command of Alfonso, Duke of Calabria.

Malatesta won the clash. According to Niccolò Machiavelli, "this battle was fought with more virtue than any other that had been made in fifty years of Italy".

1482 in Europe
15th century in the Kingdom of Naples
15th century in the Papal States
Campomorto 1482
Campomorto 1482
Campomorto
Campomorto